Vârfurile is a commune in Arad County, Romania. It lies on the north-western part of the Hălmagiu Basin, at the feet of Bihor and Codru-Moma Mountains. Its territory is 13600 ha. It is composed of eight villages: Avram Iancu (Ácsva), Groși (Halmágygóros), Lazuri (Irtványfalu), Măgulicea (Kismaglód), Mermești (Mermesd), Poiana (Csúcsmező), Vârfurile (situated at 128 km from Arad) and Vidra.

Population
According to the last census, the population of the commune counts 3298 inhabitants, out of which 98,9% are Romanians, 1,0% Roms and 0,1% are of other or undeclared nationalities.

History
The first documentary record of the locality Vîrfurile dates back to 1390.
The other settlements were attested documentary as it follows: Avram Iancu in 1956, Groși in 1760, Lazuri in 1427, Măgulicea in 1427, Mermești in 1760, Poiana in 1510 and Vidra in 1477.

Economy
Although the economy of the commune is mainly agrarian, based on livestock-breeding and olericulture, logging, conversion of timber, lumbering industry and industry of building materials are also well represented.

Tourism
Tourism is an economic branch that has undergone an ascendant development through the promotion of rural tourism in the past few years. Possessing an extremely attractive natural fond and a rich ethno-folkloric potential, Vîrfurile commune can be called a significant touristic place of the county. Among the main tourist sights we can mention the wooden church in Groși - architectural monument dating from 1907, the wooden church in Vidra built in 1784 and the wooden church in Poiana dating back to
1751. An annually organized ethno-folkloric manifestation called "Nedeia de la Tăcășele" takes place in Avram Iancu.

References

Communes in Arad County
Localities in Crișana